& Privé HD is an Indian pay television channel that was launched on 24 September 2017. The channel broadcasts English movies.

References

External links
& Prive on Zee5

2017 establishments in Maharashtra
English-language television stations in India
Movie channels in India
Television channels and stations established in 2017
Television stations in Mumbai
Zee Entertainment Enterprises